Gernhardt is a German surname. Notable people with the surname include:

Leopold Gernhardt (1920–2013), German footballer and manager
Michael L. Gernhardt (born 1956), American astronaut
Robert Gernhardt (1937–2006), German writer, artist and poet

German-language surnames